The Sportek Baseball Field, was the home ground for Israeli baseball teams Netanya Tigers and Tel Aviv Lightning in the Israel Baseball League. Sportek was originally supposed to be open for the start of the IBL season in 2007, however due to construction delays it did not open until two weeks later, on 10 July 2007. Additionally due to the delays many safety features were not complete, such as padding on the fences.

Many features common in most ballparks also were not present. Bullpens were also never built, forcing pitchers to warm up in foul territory. Dugouts were nothing more than canvas tents and benches. Down the right field line a home run was only 240' away, considerably shorter than any professional ballpark. Rather than traditional stadium seating, Sportek only offered green plastic chairs. Without lights at Sportek all IBL games had to be played during day time, in the hot Israeli summer heat.

It is located in Tel Aviv in the southern end of Tel Aviv's largest outdoor public park, a 10-minute walk from the seaside Tel Aviv hotels. Sportek is a multipurpose facility, with space for basketball, soccer, wall climbing, skating, jobbing, frisbee, and trampolining.

References

Baseball in Israel
Sports venues in Tel Aviv